Robert Edward Dill (April 25, 1920 – April 16, 1991) was an American professional ice hockey player. He played 76 games in the National Hockey League with the New York Rangers during the 1943–44 and 1944–45 seasons. The rest of his career, which lasted from 1938 to 1952, was spent in the minor leagues.

Playing career
Dill played professionally in the American Hockey League alongside his boyhood hero, Hockey Hall of Famer Eddie Shore for the Springfield Indians, in the United States Hockey League for the St. Paul Saints and in the National Hockey League for the New York Rangers.

Throughout his hockey career, Bob Dill was considered an intense, but a clean player with an aggressive style of play. While with the New York Rangers, Dill's battles with Montreal Canadiens great Maurice "Rocket" Richard were a bit overblown by the Montreal press. Dill had fought Richard's teammates Mike McMahon and Butch Bouchard long before ever mixing it up with the Rocket. Richard did knock Dill down behind the net and sucker punched him in the penalty box and with the newspapers unable to resist the pun in the resulting news stories as in "Dill pickled. The true story is that the Rangers never sent Dill after Richard, and nobody was knocked out cold. <ref> interview with Dill in 1990, interview with game Ref King Clancy in 1988, and interview with Richard in 1994. He was depicted in the 2005 French Canadian film The Rocket by then-active NHL forward Sean Avery.

Bob Dill was also a star baseball player with the AAA Minneapolis Millers baseball team. A minor league team of the New York Giants, the Millers organization was the "stopping point" for Ted Williams, Willie Mays and many other greats on their way to the "majors." 
 
Dill was sought by the Giants Major League Baseball organization. Had Dill played for the Giants, he would have been the first (and only) American to play both NHL hockey and Major League Baseball, becoming the first since Canadian-born Jim Riley accomplished the feat in 1921. The proposed contract was rejected, however, by the New York Rangers because the schedules of the two sports overlapped. In that era, the NHL contracts (and professional sports contracts in general) were more restrictive, and with players having far less latitude for making career decisions than they do today.

After the 1944–45 NHL season the New York Rangers sent Dill to the Rangers farm team, the St. Paul Saints, because Dill was a St. Paul native and therefore he would be good for improving attendance, which he did. Dill went on to five more years of successful play for the Saints, He was a 1st team all star in 1947 and 1950 and led the Saints to a USHL Championship in 1948. Fans filled the stands to watch a great rivalry between the St. Paul Saints and the Minneapolis Millers hockey team, one of whose star players was another Minnesota hockey legend, John Mariucci.

Post-playing career
After serving as a player-coach for Shore in Springfield during the 1951–52 season, Dill retired. Following his playing days Dill worked as an NHL scout for the New York Rangers, Chicago Blackhawks, and Minnesota North Stars.

Career statistics

Regular season and playoffs

References

External links
 

1920 births
1991 deaths
American men's ice hockey defensemen
Baltimore Orioles (ice hockey) players
Chicago Blackhawks scouts
Ice hockey people from Minnesota
Minnesota North Stars scouts
New York Rangers players
New York Rangers scouts
United States Coast Guard Cutters players
United States Hockey Hall of Fame inductees
Ice hockey people from Saint Paul, Minnesota